Abu Bakr Ahmad Haleem  (Urdu: ابو بكر احمد حليم; commonly known as A. B. A. Haleem) (1897 – 20 April 1975) was a Pakistani Muhajir political scientist and the first vice-chancellor of Karachi University.

Early life and career
Abu Bakr Ahmed Haleem was born in 1897 in Irki village in Bihar, British Indian Empire (now in India). From the Patna University he gained  Bachelor of Arts and Master of Arts degrees in political science. He attended the University of Oxford in England where he gained a Doctor of Philosophy degree in political science and was called at Lincoln's Inn as Bar-at-law. Upon returning to Indiain 1923, Haleem accepted a professorship in history at the Aligarh Muslim University. In 1944, he joined the Muslim League and took active participation in Pakistan Movement. At one point he reportedly told Muhammad Ali Jinnah: "Mr. Jinnah, we are teaching history and you are making it." In support of Jinnah, the AMU was also closed on 3 November 1941. The University Muslim League also formed a writers committee under Haleem which produced articles and pamphlets on Pakistan.

After the establishment of Pakistan in 1947, Haleem was appointed the first Vice-Chancellor of Sindh University at the behest of Jinnah and in 1951 he gained that post at Karachi University.

In 1970, he became chairman of Pakistan Institute of International Affairs (PIIA) which he chaired until 1974. In 1975, he once returned to Karachi University to teach political science and stayed there until his death on 20 April 1975.

Death and legacy
He died on 20 April 1975 in Karachi.

References

Further reading

1897 births
1975 deaths
People from Bihar
Patna University alumni
Alumni of the University of Oxford
Pakistani scholars
Pakistani political scientists
Academic staff of Aligarh Muslim University
Pakistan Movement activists from Bihar
Academic staff of the University of Karachi
Vice-Chancellors of the University of Karachi
Vice-Chancellors of the University of Sindh
Pakistani political writers
Pakistani people of Bihari descent
20th-century political scientists